Montese is a town in the province of Modena, Emilia-Romagna, Italy. 

During World War II, the town was liberated by Brazilian forces on 17 April 1945, after three days of battle against German forces.

There are neighborhoods in the Brazilian cities of Fortaleza and Belém named after the Italian city, in homage to the three Brazilian soldiers who died in the battle to take Montese from the Germans during World War II.

Sources

Cities and towns in Emilia-Romagna